Guy Godfree is a Canadian cinematographer. He is most noted for his work on the film Maudie, for which he won the 2017 Canadian Society of Cinematographers award for feature film cinematography.

Originally from Pugwash, Nova Scotia, he is a graduate of the American Film Institute Conservatory.

His other credits have included the films Wet Bum, Frost, Natasha, Suck It Up, Giant Little Ones, The Parting Glass, Buffaloed, Plus One, Let Him Go and Wildhood.

References

External links
 
 

Year of birth missing (living people)
Living people
People from Cumberland County, Nova Scotia
Canadian cinematographers